The following is a listing of the 106 half-hour episodes of Rhoda aired during its run on CBS from September 9, 1974, to December 9, 1978, and the four half-hour episodes subsequently aired in syndication.

Series overview

Episodes

Season 1 (1974–1975)
Season 1 of Rhoda consisted of 25 half-hour episodes, including the one-hour wedding episode.
The show originally aired on CBS on Monday nights at 9:30 p.m., between Maude and Medical Center.
The first season's opening credits consisted of photographs of her souvenirs that define Rhoda Morgenstern's life, and was narrated by Valerie Harper.
The closing credits consisted of Rhoda crossing Broadway and Seventh Avenue in Times Square.  Here, Rhoda attempts her version of Mary Tyler Moore's trademark hat toss, but the hat slips from her hand and falls to the ground.  This remained in use until Season 3.

Season 2 (1975–1976)
Season 2 of Rhoda consisted of 24 half-hour episodes.
With Rhoda in its new time slot on CBS, the show moved to Monday nights at 8:00 p.m.
The opening credits have changed to feature clips from Season 1 episodes, intercut with Rhoda in many different activities around New York City.

Season 3 (1976–1977)
Season 3 of Rhoda consisted of 24 half-hour episodes.
With Rhoda still on Monday nights at 8:00 p.m., the show moved to CBS on Sunday nights in the 8:00 p.m. time slot.
The opening credits have changed to show the title's name over a shot of Rhoda in New York City, intercut with clips from many episodes of Seasons 1–3.
This is the last season to feature David Groh as Joe Gerard before leaving the show to star in a short-lived CBS series Another Day in 1978.
Ron Silver joins the cast as Gary Levy, while Ray Buktenica joins the cast as Benny Goodwin.

Season 4 (1977–1978)
Season 4 of Rhoda consisted of 24 half-hour episodes.
The show still aired on CBS on Sunday nights at 8:00 p.m.
Nancy Walker and Harold Gould returned to the series in this season, while Kenneth McMillan joined the cast as Jack Doyle.
This is the last season to feature Gary Levy (Ron Silver) before leaving the show.
The opening credits have changed to show Rhoda in many different activities around New York City (namely Rockefeller Center, the IND 57th Street Station, Park Avenue, Little Italy and Central Park) with her sister Brenda.
The closing credits have changed to feature Rhoda walking out of the New York Public Library Main Branch, and walking down the sidewalk towards Fifth Avenue. This remained in use until the show's ending in 1978.

Season 5 (1978)
Season 5 of Rhoda consisted of 13 half-hour episodes.
With Rhoda in its new day and time, the show moved to Saturday nights at 8:00 p.m.
The footage during the opening and closing credits remained the same as in Season 4, however, with a different arrangement of the theme song.
Nancy Lane joined the cast for the show's final season, as Tina Molinaro.

References

External links
 
 

Rhoda
The Mary Tyler Moore Show